The Episcopal Diocese of North Dakota is the diocese of the Episcopal Church in the United States of America with jurisdiction over the state of North Dakota plus Clay County, Minnesota. It has 19 congregations in North Dakota and one in Moorhead, Minnesota. It is in Province VI and its cathedral, Gethsemane Episcopal Cathedral, is in Fargo, as are the diocesan offices.

The most recent diocesan bishop, Michael G. Smith, retired on May 1, 2019, and was subsequently named an assisting bishop in the Diocese of Dallas. He is an enrolled member of the Potawatomi Nation of Oklahoma and is a graduate of Seabury-Western Theological Seminary.

In August 2019, Keith Whitmore, a retired Bishop of Eau Claire, was named assisting bishop in North Dakota. In February 2021, Thomas C. Ely, a retired Bishop of Vermont, was elected bishop provisional.

List of bishops
The bishops of the diocese have been:
 William D. Walker, 1883–1896
 Samuel Cook Edsall, 1899–1901
 Cameron D. Mann, 1902–1913
 John Poyntz Tyler, 1914–1931
 Frederick B. Bartlett, 1931–1935
 Douglass H. Atwill, 1937–1951
 Richard R. Emery, 1951–1964
 George T. Masuda, 1965–1979
 Harold A. Hopkins Jr., 1980–1988
 Andrew H. Fairfield, 1989–2003
 Michael G. Smith, 2004–2019
 Thomas C. Ely, Provisional Bishop, 2021-

* Keith Whitmore, Assisting Bishop, 2019-

Congregations

All Saint's, Minot
All Saint's, Valley City
Church of the Advent, Devils Lake
Church of the Cross, Selfridge
Church of the Good Shepherd, Lakota
Gethsemane Cathedral, Fargo
Grace Church, Jamestown
St. Gabriel's Camp, Solen
St. George's Episcopal Memorial Church, Bismarck
St. James’, Cannon Ball
St. John the Divine Episcopal Church (Moorhead, Minnesota)
St. John's, Dickinson
St. Luke's, Fort Yates
Sts. Mary and Mark, Oakes
St. Michaels and All Angel's, Cartwright
St. Paul's, Grand Forks
St. Paul's, White Shield
St. Peter's, Walhalla
St. Peter's, Williston
St. Stephen's, Fargo
St. Sylvan's, Dunseith
St. Thomas, Fort Totten

See also

 Succession of Bishops of The Episcopal Church (U.S.)

References

Further reading
God giveth the increase; the history of the Episcopal Church in North Dakota, Robert P Wilkins and Wynona H Wilkins

External links
 Episcopal Diocese of North Dakota website
 Gethsemane Episcopal Cathedral website
 Journal of the Annual Convention, Diocese of North Dakota

North Dakota
Christianity in North Dakota
 
Religious organizations established in 1883
Anglican dioceses established in the 19th century
Province 6 of the Episcopal Church (United States)